Fuse is the only studio album by the rock band Fuse. It was recorded in 1969 and released in January 1970, before they broke up and with members going on to form Cheap Trick and Silver Fox.

Production and release
Fuse was born in Rockford, in late 1968. A single was released on Ken Adamany's Smack Records label with the tunes "Hound Dog" and "Crusin for Burgers." In 1969 an album was recorded with producer Jackie Mills, and released in January 1970. The titles of the single appear on the CD "Re-issue" by Rewind.

Critical reception
The album was not as successful as the band or label hoped. According to Richie Unterberger of Allmusic, "The album is an average, perhaps somewhat below average, late-'60s hard rock recording. It looks forward to some facets of '70s metal and art rock in its overwrought vocals, tandem hard rock guitar riffs, and classical-influenced keyboards."

Rick Nielsen has nothing good to say about the Fuse album, stating "Tom Petersson and I were in a Midwest band called Fuse. The guys we were with were all rinky dinks; they’re probably pumping gas now. Tom and I had the stick-to-it-iveness and positive thinking to know what we wanted to do, so we split the band and went off to hang out in England.... That Fuse stuff stinks. We don’t stand by it." By Petersson's account, "The band was much better than the album indicates. When it came out we were disgusted. The producer was an idiot."

The other band members were not rinky dinks, far from it. Guitarist Craig Myers was a guitar prodigy, playing in bands since he was 12 or 13 years old. Drummer Chip Greenman was also universally respected amongst his peers, as was singer Joe Sundberg. In fact Craig, Chip and Tom Peterson were bandmates in Toastin Jam, the band Rick Nielsen essentially joined when he broke up the version of The Grim Reapers that was a cover band in order to pursue creating original music with the talented musicians in Toastin Jam.

Jackie Mills produced quality psychedelic rock records with Kaleidoscope and The Floating Bridge before working with Fuse. Fuse had been together for less than a year when they recorded the album, so presumably the material was written in that short period of time, and the band members were novice songwriters.

Track listing
All songs arranged by Fuse, except for "To Your Health", arranged by Chip Greenman, Craig Meyers, Rick Nielsen and Tom Peterson
Side 1
 "Across The Skies"- (Joe Sundberg, Rick Nielsen) - 4:35
 "Permanent Resident" - (Craig Meyers, Sundberg) - 4:22
 "Show Me" - (Nielsen) - 4:13
 "To Your Health" - (Nielsen) - 6:00
Side 2
 "In A Window" - (Sundberg, Nielsen) - 5:54
 "4/4 3/4" - (Meyers, Sundberg) - 3:58
 "Mystery Ship" - (Meyers, Sundberg) - 3:22
 "Sad Day" - (Nielsen) - 5:49

(see Epic Records label BN26502)

Personnel
 Joe Sundberg - vocals
 Craig Meyers - lead guitar
 Rick Nielsen - organ, Mellotron, guitar
 Tom Peterson - bass
 Chip Greenman - drums

References

1970 debut albums
Epic Records albums
Fuse (band) albums